Buffalo is a town in, and the county seat of, Harding County, South Dakota, United States.  The population was 346 at the 2020 census.

Trivia
Buffalo has been assigned the ZIP code 57720 and the FIPS place code 08140.

History
Buffalo was established in 1909.  It was named for the large herds of bison (mistakenly called buffalo) that once roamed the area. It is about fifty miles west of Bison, South Dakota.

Geography
Buffalo, South Dakota, is located at  (45.584845, -103.545001).

Climate
Buffalo has a cold semi-arid climate (Köppen BSk). Like all of the High Plains, this climate features summers with cool to pleasant mornings and typically very warm to hot afternoons, alongside winters that average freezing but are extremely variable due to the conflict between hot Chinook winds and cold Arctic air.

Demographics

2010 census
As of the census of 2010, there were 330 people, 168 households, and 86 families residing in the town. The racial makeup of the town was 97.3% White, 0.9% Native American, 0.3% from other races, and 1.5% from two or more races. Hispanic or Latino of any race were 1.5% of the population.

There were 168 households, of which 22.0% had children under the age of 18 living with them, 41.7% were married couples living together, 7.1% had a female householder with no husband present, 2.4% had a male householder with no wife present, and 48.8% were non-families. 46.4% of all households were made up of individuals, and 19.6% had someone living alone who was 65 years of age or older. The average household size was 1.96 and the average family size was 2.80.

The median age in the town was 43.8 years. 21.2% of residents were under the age of 18; 5.8% were between the ages of 18 and 24; 24.6% were from 25 to 44; 30.6% were from 45 to 64; and 17.9% were 65 years of age or older. The gender makeup of the town was 52.7% male and 47.3% female.

See also
 List of towns in South Dakota

References

External links

 Town of Buffalo, SD - Official Website
 Harding County School District

Towns in Harding County, South Dakota
Towns in South Dakota
County seats in South Dakota
Populated places established in 1909
1909 establishments in South Dakota